This is a list of schools in the Asian country of Jordan (officially the Hashemite Kingdom of Jordan), sorted alphabetically by the Jordanian governorate to which each school belongs.  This list includes primary schools and secondary schools; tertiary schools are included at the list of universities in Jordan.

Governorates
Jordan is divided into twelve governorates (muhafazah) as follows:

([P] indicates a private school)

Ajloun Governorate
Schools in the Ajloun Governorate include:

 Ajloun Baptist School

Amman Governorate
Schools in the Amman Governorate include:

 Abdul Hamid Sharaf School; IGCSE; SAT; مدرسة عبد الحميد شرف
 Abul Bakkar School
 Ahliyyah & Mutran School; IB
 Ahmed Toqan School
 Al-Asriyah School; CIPP; المدارس العصرية
 Al-Redwan Schools;  مدارس الرضوان
 Al Raed Al Arabi School
 Alliance Academy Jordan
 Amman Academy
 Amman Adventist Secondary School – Jabal Amman 
 Amman Baptist School; IB; IGCSE; المدارس المعمدانية عمان
 American Community School in Amman
 Amman Baccalaureate School
 Amman National School
 Arab Model Schools; IGCSE; المدارس النموذجية العربية
 British International Academy; IB; الاكادمية البريطانية الدولية للبنات
 Bunat Aghad Academy
 Cambridge High School; IB
 De La Salle Frere
 The International Academy – Amman; IB; الاكادمية الدولية
 International Independent Schools (المدارس المستقلة الدولية); SAT; ACT; AP; administers PSAT/NMSQT and AP examinations
 International Leaders Academy; أكاديمية القادة الدولية
 International School of Choueifat
 Islamic Educational College; IGCSE; SAT; مدارس الكلية العلمية الاسلامية
 Jordanian International Schools for Girls; IGCSE; المدارس الاردنية الدولية للبنات
 Lycée Français d'Amman (The French School of Amman)
 Mashrek International School; IB; مدارس المشرق الدولية
 Mayar International Schools; مدارس ميار الدولية 
 Modern American School
 Modern European Schools
 Modern Montessori School
 Modern Systems School; مدارس النظم الحديثة
 National Orthodox School; IGCSE; المدرسة الوطنية الأرثوذكسية
 Patriarch Diodoros The 1st School
 Philadelphia National School; IGCSE; SAT; مدارس فيلادلفيا الوطنية
 Prince Hamza Bin Al Hussien School
 Rawdat Al-Ma'aref School; IGCSE; روضة المعارف
 Remas International Academy; مدرسة أكاديمية ريماس الدولية
 Retaal International Academy; IGCSE; SAT; مدارس أكاديمية ريتال الدولية
 Repton New English School
 Rosary College School Amman
 Rosary Sisters School
 Sa'adeh College School
 Sands National Academy; IGCSE; SAT; اكادمية ساندس الوطنية
 Scientific Reyada School ( مدرسة الرياة العلمية )
 Terrasanta College; كلية تراسانطة
 Universal Civilizations Academy; IGCSE; SAT; اكاديمية الحضارات الدولية

Aqaba Governorate
Schools in the Aqaba Governorate include:

 Al Qimma Schools – Amman [P]
 Aqaba International School [P]
 Ittihad Schools Aqaba
 Madrasit Al Maaref (مدرسة المعارف)
 Salt Academy School

Balqa Governorate
Schools in the Balqa Governorate include:
 Balqa Islamic School

Irbid Governorate
Schools in the Irbi Governorate include:

 Summit International Academy
 King Abdullah school for excellence [P]
 Adventist School
 Al-Arabiya Model School
 Al-Manara Schools [P]
 Al-Nahda Private School [P]
 Dar Al Uloum Schools [P]
 Greek Catholic School
 International Grand Academy
 Islamic School [P] (Al-Madares Al-Islamiya)
 Irbid International Schools
 Irbid Model School [P]
 Jeel Al Jadeed School
 Jordan National Schools [P]
 Khawla Bint Alazwar [P]
 Shoa'a Alammel School [P]
 Yarmouk University Model School [P]

Madaba Governorate
Schools in the Madaba Governorate include:

 Khadija Bent Khoweld School
 King's Academy [P]
 The Latin Patriarchate Schools [P]

Tafilah Governorate
Schools in the Tafilah Governorate include:

 Tafilah International Community School

Zarqa Governorate
Schools in the Zarqa Governorate include:

 American Continental Schools
 Zarqa Baptist Schools
 Zarqa Modern Schools

See also 

 Education in Jordan
 Lists of schools

External links 
 Jordan Ministry of Education
 Jordan Ministry of Higher Education & Scientific Research

Schools
Schools
Schools
Jordan
Jordan